In Hindu mythology, the Solar dynasty (IAST: Suryavaṃśa or Ravivaṃśa in Sanskrit) or the Ikshvaku dynasty was founded by the legendary king Ikshvaku.

According to the Jain tradition, the first Tirthankara of Jainism, Rishabhanatha himself was King Ikshvaku. Further, 21 Tirthankaras of Jainism were born in this dynasty. 

According to Buddhist texts and tradition, The Buddha descended from this dynasty. Many later kings of the Indian subcontinent claimed to be of Suryavamsha descent.

The important personalities belonging to this royal house are Mandhatri, Muchukunda, Ambarisha, Bharata Chakravartin, Bahubali, Harishchandra, Dilīpa, Sagara, Raghu, and Pasenadi. Both the Hindu Puranas and the Buddhist texts include Shuddodhana, Gautama Buddha, and Rahula in their accounts of the Ikshvaku dynasty but, according to the Buddhist texts, Mahasammata, an ancestor of Ikshvaku who was elected by the people as the first king of the present era, was the founder of this dynasty.

Origins

Suryavamsha, or the Solar Dynasty, is one of the two major legendary Kshatriya dynasties found in Hindu Puranic and epic literature, the other being Chandravamsha or the Lunar Dynasty. According to Harivamsa, Ikshvaku is considered the primogenitor of the dynasty of, and was granted the kingdom of Aryavarta by his father Vaivasvata Manu. Manu settled down in the Aryavarta region after he survived the great flood. A. K. Mozumdar states that Manu is the one who built a city on the Sarayu (being the river that his mother Sanjana was the goddess of) and called it Ayodhya meaning the 'invincible city'. This city served as the capital of many kings from the solar dynasty and is also believed to be the birthplace of Rama.

Some Hindu texts suggest Rishi Marichi, one of the seven sages and first human creations of Brahma as the progenitor of the dynasty. Marichi's eldest son Kashyapa is said to have settled down in Kashmir (Kashyapa-Meru or Kashyameru). He also contributed to the verses of the Vedas. Later, Vivasvan, son of Kashyapa and Aditi, famously known as the Hindu god Surya married Saranyu who was the daughter of Vishvakarman, the architect of devas. He had many children but Manu was given the responsibility of building the civilization and as a result it formed a dynasty that was named 'Suryavamsha' or the solar dynasty. Manu is also the progenitor of the Lunar Dynasty because he married his daughter Ila to Budha, the son of Chandra or the moon god and the couple gave birth to the magnanimous King Pururavas who became the first king of the Chandravamsha, or the Lunar dynasty.

Historical claimants
After the death of the powerful king Prasenjit and disappearance of his successor Viḍūḍabha after defeating the Shakyas, the kingdom of Kosala declined. King Sumitra, who regarded himself to be the last Suryavamsha ruler, was defeated by the powerful emperor Mahapadma Nanda of Magadha in 362 BCE. However, he wasn't killed, and fled to Rohtas, located in present-day Bihar.

Bhagavata Purana
Ikshvaku and his ancestor Manu are also mentioned in the Bhagavata Purana (Canto 9, Chapter 1),

In Buddhism 
The Buddhist text, Buddhavaṃsa and Mahāvaṃsa (II, 1–24) traces the origin of the Shakyas to king Okkaka (Pali equivalent to Sanskrit Ikshvaku) and gives their genealogy from Mahasammata, an ancestor of Okkaka. This list comprises the names of a number of prominent kings of the Ikshvaku dynasty, namely, Mandhata and Sagara. The genealogy according to the Mahavamsa is as follows:
 Okkāka
 Okkāmukha
 Sivisamjaya
 Sihassara
 Jayasena
Sihahanu
 Suddhodana
 Gautama Buddha
 Rāhula

In Jainism 

The Ikshvaku dynasty has a significant place in Jainism, as twenty-two Tirthankaras were born in this dynasty.

Origin
Rishabhanatha (son of King Nabhi), the founder of Jainism in the present Avasarpani era (descending half time cycle as per Jain cosmology and Manvantara in hindu cosmology) is said to have founded the Ikshvaku dynasty. The name for the Ikshvaku dynasty comes from the word ikhsu (sugarcane), another name of Rishabhanatha, because he taught people how to extract ikshu-rasa (sugarcane-juice).
 Bharata Chakravarti (first Chakravartin) and Bahubali (first Kamadeva), sons of Rishabha
Arkakirti and Marichi, son of Bharata
at the time of Ajitanatha
Jitashatru (father of Ajitanatha) and his younger brother Sumitra (father of Sagara)
Ajitanatha (the 2nd Tirthankara) and Sagara (2nd Chakravartin)
Janhu (eldest son of Sagara), the one who flooded village of Nagas with waters of Ganga leading to turning of sixty thousand sons of Sagara into ashes by Jawalanprabha (emperor of Nagas)
Bhagiratha (eldest grandson of Sagara)
at the time of Sambhavanatha
Jitari (father of Sambhavanatha)
Sambhavanatha, the 3rd Tirthankara
at the time of Abhinandananatha
Sanvara (father of Abhinandananatha)
Abhinandananatha, the 4th Tirthankara
at the time of Sumatinatha
Megha (father of Sumatinatha)
Sumatinatha, the 5th Tirthankara
at the time of Padmaprabha
Sidhara (father of Padmaprabha)
Padmaprabha, the 6th Tirthankara
at the time of Suparshvanatha
Pratishtha (father of Suparshvanatha)
Suparshvanatha, the 7th Tirthankara
at the time of Chandraprabha
Mahasena (father of Chanraprabha)
Chandraprabha, the 8th Tirthankara
at the time of Pushpadanta
Sugriva (father of Pushpadanta)
Pushpadanta, the 9th Tirthankara
at the time of Shitalanatha
Dridharatha (father of Shitalnatha)
Shitalanatha, the 10th Tirthankara
at the time of Shreyanasanatha
Vishnu (father of Shreyanasanatha)
Shreyanasanatha, the 11th Tirthankara
at the time of Vasupujya
Vasupujya (father of Tirthankara Vasupujya)
Vasupujya, the 12th Tirthankara
at the time of Vimalanatha
Kritavarma (father of Vimalanatha)
Vimalanatha, the 13th Tirthankara
at the time of Anantanatha
Simhasena (father of Anantanatha)
Anantanatha, the 14th Tirthankara
at the time of Dharmanatha
Bhanu (father of Dharmanatha)
Dharmanatha, the 15th Tirthankara
at the time of Shantinatha
Visvasena (father of Shantinatha)
Shantinatha, the 16th Tirthankara and 5th Chakravarti
 Chakrayudha, son of Shantinatha
 Kuruchandra, son of Chakrayudha
at the time of Kunthunatha
Sura (father of Kunthunatha)
Kunthunatha, the 17th Tirthankara and 6th Chakravarti
at the time of Aranatha
Sudarsana (father of Aranatha)
Arahnatha, the 18th Tirthankara and 7th Chakravarti
at the time of Mallinatha
Kumbha (father of Mallinatha)
Māllīnātha, the 19th Tirthankara
 Munisuvrata(Munisuvrata himself was not from Ikshvaku, but Harivamsa)the 20th Tirthankara
at the time of Naminatha
Vijaya (father of Naminatha)
Naminatha, the 21st Tirthankara
at the time of Parshvanatha
Asvasena (father of Parshvanatha)
Parshvanatha, the 23rd Tirthankara
at the time of Mahavira
Siddhartha (father of Mahavira)
Mahavira, the 24th Tirthankara

See also 
 Hinduism
 Lunar Dynasty
 List of Ikshvaku dynasty kings in Hinduism
 List of Hindu empires and dynasties
 List of Jain states and dynasties

References

Citations

Sources
 

Hindu dynasties
Buddhist dynasties
Jain dynasties
Vedic period
Kingdoms in the Mahabharata
Kshatriya communities